The Little Huron River is an  stream that flows entirely within Powell Township in northwest Marquette County, Michigan, in the United States. It rises on the slopes of Mount Benison and Superior Mountain in the west end of the Huron Mountains. For almost half of its length it flows generally southwesterly then westerly as it is joined by creeks from other arms of its valley. It then turns north, flowing through gentler terrain to its mouth on the south shore of Lake Superior.

Name confusion
Adding to name confusion, the Huron River has Little West Branch and Little East Branch tributaries.

References

Rivers of Michigan
Tributaries of Lake Superior
Rivers of Marquette County, Michigan